Robin Peter Aitken MBE (born 24 November 1952) is a British journalist who for many years worked for the BBC. His 2007 book Can We Trust the BBC? alleged pervasive and institutional left-wing bias at the BBC. He has held a seminar on this subject at the Thomas More Institute. He is co-founder of the Oxford Foodbank and was appointed Member of the Order of the British Empire (MBE) in the 2014 Birthday Honours for services to vulnerable people.

Personal life
Aitken, a Roman Catholic, is married to Sarah and has two daughters. He lives in Oxford.

Works

References

External links
BBC Insider Exposes BBC Bias & Lack of Diversity of Opinion. Out of Touch BBC is Its Own Worst Enemy, New Cultural Forum, 1 March 2020. Retrieved 31 July 2021.

1952 births
Living people
Alumni of the University of Bristol
BBC newsreaders and journalists
British Roman Catholics
Members of the Order of the British Empire
People from Oxford
Writers from Oxford